This is a list of Dutch television related events from 1982.

Events
24 February - Bill van Dijk is selected to represent Netherlands at the 1982 Eurovision Song Contest with his song "Jij en ik". He is selected to be the twenty-seventh Dutch Eurovision entry during Nationaal Songfestival held at Circustheater in Scheveningen.

Debuts

Television shows

1950s
NOS Journaal (1956–present)

1970s
Sesamstraat (1976–present)

1980s
Jeugdjournaal (1981–present)

Ending this year

Births
6 February - Lieke van Lexmond, model, actress, TV presenter & singer
25 February - Aukje van Ginneken, actress & singer
28 June - Gigi Ravelli, actress & TV presenter

Deaths